The Miguel Pro Human Rights Center (PRODH) is a Jesuit human rights society based in Mexico, founded in 1988.

Activities 
PRODH works with the Inter-American Human Rights System, and Human Rights Watch, UN treaty bodies and Special Rapporteurs, and with international and regional NGOs.

It advocates for the demilitarization of Mexico's security apparatus. and protection of women against sexual abuse by the police. PRODH also works with the defense of land rights.

PRODH offers training for victims, movements, organizations, and human rights defenders, and facilitates human rights activists’ legal, media, and advocacy work in various regions of Mexico. The Center monitors elections and has pointed to misuse of US aid. It offers legal help in obtaining the release of prisoners of conscience. Since September 2001, PRODH has held Consultative Status before the Economic and Social Council of the United Nations and is an Accredited Organization before the Organization of American States.

References 
 

Human rights organizations based in Mexico
Jesuit development centres
Organizations established in 1988